The third season of the Seven Network television series A Place to Call Home premiered on SoHo on 27 September 2015 and concluded on 29 November 2015. The series is produced by Chris Martin-Jones, and executive produced by Penny Win and Julie McGauran.

Production
Helen Vnuk from TV Week confirmed that a third season had been commissioned in May 2014. However, one month later, the magazine reported that Channel Seven had passed on the option to renew the series and had recently told the cast and crew they would not be required for a third season.

On 15 October 2014, it was announced that Foxtel had finalised a deal with Channel Seven that would see third and fourth seasons written, using the outlines created by Bevan Lee, produced by Seven Productions, but aired on Foxtel.

On 25 October 2014, Amy Harris of The Daily Telegraph announced that A Place to Call Home had been officially renewed for another two seasons and would return in late 2015, airing on Foxtel channel SoHo. It was also announced that all the original cast and crew members would return. Production was scheduled to resume in March 2015 in Camden, the show's original filming location.

On 19 November 2014, it was announced that Bevan Lee had stepped down as the script producer and had hand-picked Susan Bower to take over. As well as a new script producer, a new writing team, consisting of David Hannam, Sarah Lambert, Giula Sandler and Katherine Thomson, was also hired.

The season has been written by Susan Bower, Katherine Thomson, Sarah Lambert, David Hannam, Giula Sandler, Deborah Parsons, Kim Wilson and John Ridley, and directed by Ian Watson, Shirley Barrett, Lynn-Maree Danzey and Chris Martin-Jones.

Plot
In season three of A Place to Call Home: as Australia faces internal and external threats to its way of life so too do the people of Inverness, and previous alliances and relationships are tested. Sarah's dilemma, between her feelings for George and her duty to her husband Rene, is exacerbated by a heartbreaking secret. James and Olivia's relationship is under pressure when the true parentage of baby George is threatened with exposure. Elizabeth Bligh's decision to leave Ash Park to explore a life of her own proves more difficult than she thought. Anna and Gino face the difference between the fairytale romance and the reality of married life. Independent lovers Carolyn and Jack try to move closer to a commitment. Through it all, Regina's manipulative behaviour weaves an impenetrable web around George. In the sleepy village of Inverness, sex, death and secrets are never far below the surface.

Cast

Main
 Marta Dusseldorp as Sarah Nordmann
 Noni Hazelhurst as Elizabeth Bligh
 Brett Climo as George Bligh
 Craig Hall as Dr. Jack Duncan
 David Berry as James Bligh
 Abby Earl as Anna Poletti
 Arianwen Parkes-Lockwood as Olivia Bligh
 Aldo Mignone as Gino Poletti
 Sara Wiseman as Carolyn Bligh
 Jenni Baird as Regina Bligh
 Frankie J. Holden as Roy Briggs

Recurring & Guest
 Deborah Kennedy as Doris Collins
 Brenna Harding as Rose O'Connell
 Mark Lee as Sir Richard Bennett
 Ben Winspear as René Nordmann
 Tim Draxl as Dr. Henry Fox
 Scott Grimley as Norman Parker
 Robert Coleby as Douglas Goddard
 Heather Mitchell as Prudence Swanson
 Rick Donald as Lloyd Ellis Parker
 Warwick Young as Sgt. Eddie Franklin
 Judi Farr as Peg Maloney

Casting
Puberty Blues actress Brenna Harding joined the series as maid Rose O'Connell.

Episodes

Ratings

References

External links 

 
 
 

2015 Australian television seasons